McLoud may refer to:

McLoud, Oklahoma, a town in Pottawatomie County, Oklahoma, United States of America
McLoud High School, a high-school in Pottawatomie County, Oklahoma, United States of America
John William McLoud, attorney and namesake of McLoud, Oklahoma
Alex McLoud, character on the TV series Secret Diary of a Call Girl

See also
MacLeod (disambiguation)
McCloud (disambiguation)
MacLeòid
Jennifer McLoud-Mann, Native American mathematician
Smith McLoud House, a historic home located at Middlesex in Yates County, New York